Gaultheria appressa, the waxberry or white waxberry, is a shrub in the family Ericaceae. The species is endemic to Australia. Flowers appear in groups of three to eleven in racemes in late spring to summer. The sepals become fleshy, white and enlarged during fruit formation.

The species occurs in woodland, forest, subalpine scrub  and rainforest margins in New South Wales and Victoria.

References

appressa
Ericales of Australia
Flora of New South Wales
Flora of Victoria (Australia)